The Taiwan First Nations Party is a minor political party in Taiwan. Formed in 2012, the aim of the party is to represent the voices and issues of Taiwanese indigenous peoples. As of 2018 they have two locally-elected representatives; Dahu Istanda, the head of Namasia District in Kaohsiung, and Shih Ching-lung, a councillor in the Nantou County Council.

See also 
 Indigenous Area (Taiwan)

Notes

References

External links 
 

2012 establishments in Taiwan
Green political parties
Political parties established in 2012
Political parties in Taiwan
Political parties of minorities